Isaiah Saville (born September 21, 2000) is an American professional ice hockey goaltender for the Savannah Ghost Pirates of the ECHL, while under contract to the Vegas Golden Knights of the National Hockey League (NHL). He previously played junior in the North American Hockey League (NAHL) with the Minnesota Magicians and the United States Hockey League (USHL) with the Tri-City Storm, as well as NCAA collegiate hockey with the Omaha Mavericks.

Playing career

Saville began his youth career in his hometown of Anchorage, before entering the North American junior system with the Colorado Thunderbirds of the Tier 1 Elite Hockey League (T1EHL) in 2016. 

He then joined the Minnesota Magicians of the Tier II North American Hockey League (NAHL) for the 2017–18 season, before moving to the Tri-City Storm of the  Tier I United States Hockey League (USHL) for 2018–19. During his brief tenure in Tri-City, Saville was named USHL Goaltender of the Year and won the Dave Peterson Award from USA Hockey, ultimately leading the Storm to their second Anderson Cup regular-season title. At the conclusion of his time in Tri-City, Saville was drafted in the fifth round of the 2019 NHL Entry Draft by the Vegas Golden Knights.

Saville played three seasons of collegiate hockey at the University of Nebraska at Omaha. In his time with the Mavericks, Saville posted a career .907 save percentage and 2.78 goals against average, being named to the National Collegiate Hockey Conference (NCHC) honorable mention All-Star team for 2020–21.

Saville signed his three-year entry-level contract with Vegas on March 18, 2022, and joined Vegas' American Hockey League (AHL) affiliate, the Henderson Silver Knights, shortly thereafter.

International play

Saville made his international debut with the USA Hockey National Team Development Program (USNTDP) at the 2017 Ivan Hlinka Memorial Tournament, appearing in two games. Saville also appeared for the USNTDP in three games at the 2018 World Junior A Challenge, posting a .944 save percentage and 1.30 goals against average en route to a gold medal. Saville was named to the United States roster for the 2020 IIHF World Junior Championships, but did not play.

Career statistics

Regular season and playoffs

International

Awards and honors

References

External links

 
 NAHL playoff statistics from NAHL.com
 Hlinka-Gretzky Cup statistics from Hlinkagretzkycup.cz
 WJAC statistics from Hockey Canada

2000 births
Living people
African-American ice hockey players
American ice hockey goaltenders
Henderson Silver Knights players
Ice hockey people from Anchorage, Alaska
Omaha Mavericks men's ice hockey players
Savannah Ghost Pirates players
Sportspeople from Alaska
Tri-City Storm players
Vegas Golden Knights draft picks